CXorf49 is a protein, which in humans is encoded by the gene chromosome X open reading frame 49(CXorf49).

Gene

The CXorf49 gene has one alias CXorf49B. The recname A8MYA2 also refers to the protein coded by CXorf49 or CXorf49B.

CXorf49 is located on the X chromosome at Xq13.1. It is 3912 base pairs long and the gene sequence has 6 exons. CXorf49 has one protein coding  transcript.

Protein
The protein has 514 amino acids and a molecular mass of 54.4 kDa. The isoelectric point is 9.3. Compared to other human proteins CXorf49 is  glycine- and proline-rich, but the protein has lower levels of asparagine, isoleucine, tyrosine and threonine(Statistical Analysis of Protein Sequences, SAPS ).

Domains 

The domain of unknown function, DUF4641, is almost the entire protein. It is 433 amino acids long, from amino acid 80 until amino acid number 512. DUF4641 is a part of pfam15483. The domain is proline- and arginine-rich, but DUF4641 has lower levels of isoleucine, tyrosine and threonine compared to other proteins in human (Analysis of Protein Sequences, SAPS ). DUF4641 has an unusual spacing between lysine residues and positive charged amino acids (Analysis of Protein Sequences, SAPS ).

Post-translation modifications
CXorf49 is predicted to have several post-translational sites. This include sites for N-acetyltransferase (NetAcet 1-), glycation of ε amino groups of lysines (NetGlycate 1.0), mucin type GalNAc O-glycosylation  (NetOglyc 4.0), phosphorylation (NetPhos 2.0), sumoylation (SUMOplot Analysis Program) and O-ß-GlcNAc attachment(YinOYang WWW).

Subcellular localization
The CXorf49 protein has been predicted to be located in the cell nucleus (PSORT II ).

Expression

Promoter region
The promoter region of CXorf49  is located between base pair  71718051 and 71718785 on the minus strand of the X chromosome and it is 735 bp long (Genomatix’s ElDorado program). One of the most frequent transcription factor binding-sites in the promoter region are sites for Y-box binding factor.

Expression
Though expression of CXorf49 is very low in human cells, is it somewhat higher in connective tissues, testis and uterus(NCBI-Unigene ).

Interactions
The protein CXorf49 has not yet been shown to interact with other proteins (PSICQUIC).

CXorf49 is found to be one of the components of a small group of the HL-60 cell proteome that were most prone to form 4-Hydroxy-2-nonenal(HNE) adducts, upon exposure to nontoxic (10 μM) HNE concentrations, along with heat shock 60 kDa protein 1.

Homology
Using BLAST no orthologs for CXorf49 are found in single celled organisms, fungi or plants whose genomes have been sequenced. For multicellular organisms orthologs are found in mammals. The table below show a selection of the mammal orthologs. They are listed after time of divergence from human.

Phylogeny
CXorf49 has developed from aardvarks,  to the human protein over 105.0 million years.

References

Genes
Proteins